The Campeonato Argentino de Rugby  1984 was won by the selection of Buenos Aires that beat in the final the selection of the Entre Rios

Rugby Union in Argentina in 1984

National 
 The Buenos Aires Champsionship was won by San Isidro Club
 The Cordoba Province Championship was won by Tala
 The North-East Championship was won by Los Tarcos
 The selection of Buenos Aires won also the "Campeonado de Menores" (Under21 Championship)

International
 In 1984 the selection of South American Jaguars made the last tour in South Africa

First Phase

Zone A

Zone B

Zone C

Zone D

Interzone

Semifinals

Third place final

Final

Buenos Aires: 15.Bernardo Miguens, 14.Jorge de Prat Gay, 13.Diego Cuesta Silva, 12.Fabian Turnes, 11.Marcelo Campo, 10.Hugo Porta, 9.Javier Miguens, 8.Ernesto Ure, 7.José Visca, 6.Tomas Petersen, 5. Gonzalo Gasso (Carlos Durlach), 4. E. Leiva, 3.Diego Casch, 2. Andrés Courreges, 1.Luis E. Lonardi.
  Entre Rios: 15.Castello, 14.M. Lescano, 13.Campos, 12.Albornoz, 11.Annichini, 10.Comaleras, 9.Faggi, 8.Ricciardi, 7. Federik, 6. C. Lescano, 5. Dall'Ava, 4.Budni, 3.Seri (Di Prettoro), 2.Cura (Bravo), 1. Borches.

External links — bibliography 
  Memorias de la UAR 1984
  Francesco Volpe, Paolo Pacitti (Author), Rugby 2000, GTE Gruppo Editorale (1999)

Campeonato Argentino de Rugby
Argentina
Rugby